Anicet-Georges Dologuélé (born 17 April 1957) is a Central African politician who was Prime Minister of the Central African Republic from 4 January 1999 to 1 April 2001. Subsequently, he was President of the Development Bank of Central African States (BDEAC) from 2001 to 2010.

Life and career
Dologuélé was Minister of Finance and the Budget in the government of Prime Minister Michel Gbezera-Bria and subsequently served as Prime Minister from 1999 to 2001. As Prime Minister, Dologuélé, who not a member of the ruling Movement for the Liberation of the Central African People (MLPC), faced hostility from the party; on 1 April 2001, he was dismissed by President Ange-Félix Patassé and replaced by Martin Ziguélé. Dologuélé criticized this decision as putting political considerations ahead of "good management".

Dologuélé was appointed to head the BDEAC, remaining in that post for over eight years; he was eventually replaced by Mickaël Adandé from Gabon in January 2010.

In October 2013, Dologuélé founded a political party, the Union for Central African Renewal (URCA). He also planned to stand as a candidate in the next presidential election. As campaigning began for the election, which was eventually scheduled for 27 December 2015, Dologuélé presented himself as a candidate of peace and inclusion. He declared that he had "never held a weapon" and said that the ousted and exiled former President François Bozizé, who was barred from standing in the election, would be able to play some unspecified role in national affairs. Bozizé's Kwa Na Kwa party threw its support behind Dologuélé. While some thirty candidates stepped forward, only Dologuélé and Faustin-Archange Touadéra qualified for the runoff on 14 February 2016. He was beaten by Touadéra in the second round, by 62 percent to 37 percent. Although Dologuélé alleged fraud, he nevertheless stated that "for the sake of peace" he accepted the official results, would not appeal, and "recognize[d] Faustin-Archange Touadéra as the leader of all Central Africans".

In the February–March 2016 parliamentary election, Dologuélé was elected to the National Assembly as the URCA candidate in the first constituency of Bocaranga, winning in the second round with 75.33% of the vote.

Notes

References

1957 births
Living people
Prime Ministers of the Central African Republic
University of Bangui alumni
University of Bordeaux alumni
Finance ministers of the Central African Republic